Riding Shotgun is a 1954 American western film directed by Andre DeToth and starring Randolph Scott, Wayne Morris and Joan Weldon. The film was based on the short story "Riding Solo" by Kenneth Perkins, originally published in the September 1942 issue of Blue Book. The production is unusual in that Scott narrates his inner thoughts at crucial moments in the action.

Plot
Stagecoach guard Larry Delong is ambushed by a gang of outlaws associated with Dan Marady, the man who murdered his sister and nephew.  Delong has been searching for Marady, intending to kill him. When he returns to the town of Deep Water, Delong discovers that nearly everyone there believes he was involved in a holdup of the stage on which he had been the guard. The robbery resulted in the deaths of the stage driver and of the man who sat in for Delong.

With no one other than Orissa Flynn, his sweetheart, and Doc Winkler heeding his warnings that Marady's men are coming to rob the town, Delong is forced to take refuge in a cantina. A lynch mob forms, with deputy Tub Murphy trying to hold them off until the sheriff's posse returns.

Marady's men, including an accomplice, Pinto, rob the bank while the townspeople are distracted. Delong escapes through an attic and sabotages the getaway horses of Malady's gang. A shootout results in Marady mistakenly believing, fatally, that Delong is out of bullets.

Cast
 Randolph Scott as Larry Delong
 Wayne Morris as Deputy Sheriff Tub Murphy
 Joan Weldon as Orissa Flynn
 Joe Sawyer as Tom Biggert
 James Millican as Dan Marady
 Charles Buchinsky aka Charles Bronson as Pinto
 James Bell as Doc Winkler
 Fritz Feld as Fritz

References

External links
 
 
 
 

1954 films
1954 Western (genre) films
American Western (genre) films
Films directed by Andre DeToth
Warner Bros. films
Films based on short fiction
Films scored by David Buttolph
1950s English-language films
1950s American films